Ufa International Airport (Mezhdunarodnyy aeroport Ufa)  is the primary airport serving Ufa, the capital of Bashkortostan, Russia.

In 2017, the airport handled 2,810,000 passengers, becoming the tenth largest airport in Russia and the largest airport in Russia's Volga Federal District. It is also the largest airport in the federal subject (republic) of the Republic of Bashkortostan.

Former BAL Bashkirian Airlines used to be headquartered at the airport.

History

On 11 May 1924, the building of the first aircraft hangar near Glumilino village was completed. On 15 May, is opened a new aviation club within the Bashkirian branch of AFFVS.

In 1933, the first ever route opened, encompassing over 730 km via Ufa–Sterlitamak–Meleuz–Mrakovo–Baymak–Magnitogorsk–Beloretsk–Ufa.

In 1956, Ufa Airport began performing technical maintenance of the Yakovlev Yak-12 airplanes and Mil Mi-1 helicopters, which were then serving the Bashkirian air routes.

Between 1959 and 1962, the airport was under reconstruction, and three hotel buildings, cargo and fuel storage facilities, a 100-seat dining hall and a garage were built. A new runway was built, as well as radio approach equipment for landing under heavy weather conditions and new radar facilities. The new runway was then capable of receiving Tupolev Tu-124, Antonov An-10 and Ilyushin Il-18 aircraft.

In 1964, a new terminal for 400 passengers per hour was built and put in operation.

In 2007, the reconstructed terminal of the airport entered into operation. The area of the air terminal has more than doubled. Many departments are located there. There have been mounted four telescopic ramps, four elevators and three escalators. It can serve 600 passengers per hour.

Airlines and destinations

The following airlines operate regular scheduled, seasonal, and seasonal charter flights to and from Ufa:

Statistics

Annual traffic

Ground transportation
The city bus lines No. 101 and 110 and 110c connect the airport with the city of Ufa.

See also

List of the busiest airports in Russia
List of the busiest airports in Europe
List of the busiest airports in the former USSR

References

External links

 Ufa International Airport 
 
 

Transport in Ufa
Airports established in 1924
1924 establishments in the Soviet Union
Airports in Bashkortostan
Airports built in the Soviet Union